Paula Abdul: Forever Your Girl was a concert residency by American entertainer Paula Abdul at Flamingo Las Vegas in Las Vegas. It began on August 13, 2019, with shows continuing through 2020. In addition to singing and dancing to her greatest hits, Abdul told various stories of her career, including her role as a judge on American Idol. The residency marks the 30th anniversary of "Straight Up".

Background
Abdul revealed Caesars Entertainment approached her to do a residency at the Flamingo while at an event by the Nevada Ballet Theatre in January 2019. Abdul announced the residency on May 1, 2019, the same day she closed the 2019 Billboard Music Awards with a medley of her greatest hits.

Critical reception
Billboard gave a positive review of the show stating Forever Your Girl offers two-hours of back-to-back hits, a reminder to all in attendance just how many she has; as well as lots of storytelling.

Concert synopsis
The show begins with Abdul acting as choreographer from the audience, instructing her dancers in a kitsch and schtick routine. From there, she goes onstage for “Vibeology” and “(It's Just) The Way That You Love Me” and then talks about her greatest career moments, including choreographing George Michael’s The Faith Tour, Janet Jackson’s “Nasty” and “Control” videos and film Can't Buy Me Love (1987). Her animated companion from the “Opposites Attract” music video, MC Skat Kat takes on a human form side stage as a cat-costumed DJ.

Set list 
This set list is representative of the November 30, 2019, show. It may not represent all dates of the residency.

 "Vibeology"
 "(It's Just) The Way That You Love Me"
 "Crazy Cool"
"Straight Up"
 "Opposites Attract"
 "Rush Rush"
 "Blowing Kisses in the Wind"
 "The Promise of a New Day"
 "Knocked Out"
 "My Love Is for Real"
 "Cold Hearted"
 "Forever Your Girl"

Shows

Cancelled shows

References

2019 concert residencies
2020 concert residencies
Paula Abdul concert tours